John Adams Gilmer (November 4, 1805 – May 4, 1868) was a Congressional Representative from North Carolina.

Gilmer was born in Guilford County, North Carolina near Greensboro. His parents were Robert Shaw Gilmer and Anne Forbes. He was the brother of Confederate Maj. Gen Jeremy Francis Gilmer. Gilmer attended the public schools and an academy in Greensboro. After receiving his education, he taught school. He then studied law and was admitted to the bar in 1832 and began practice in Greensboro. He later served as the Guilford County solicitor. He was a member of the State senate from 1846 to 1856. In 1856, Gilmer was the Whig candidate for Governor of North Carolina but was defeated. He was elected as the candidate of the American Party to the Thirty-fifth Congress and reelected as a candidate of the Opposition Party to the Thirty-sixth Congress (March 4, 1859 – March 3, 1861). During the Thirty-sixth Congress, he was the Chairman of the Committee on Elections. In January 1861, Abraham Lincoln considered him for a position in his incoming cabinet, and William H. Seward sounded him out on the question, but Gilmer temporized until the matter was dropped. After secession, Gilmer served as a member of the Second Confederate Congress in 1864. He served as a delegate to the Union National Convention of Conservatives at Philadelphia in 1866. Gilmer died in Greensboro, North Carolina, and is interred in the Old First Presbyterian Church Cemetery at the Greensboro Historical Museum.

See also 
 Thirty-fifth United States Congress
 Thirty-sixth United States Congress

References

External links
 U.S. Congressional Biographical Directory

1805 births
1868 deaths
People from Greensboro, North Carolina
North Carolina Oppositionists
North Carolina Whigs
Know-Nothing members of the United States House of Representatives from North Carolina
Opposition Party members of the United States House of Representatives from North Carolina
Members of the Confederate House of Representatives from North Carolina
North Carolina state senators
19th-century American politicians